Tauno Rinkinen (23 July 1924 – 3 February 1993) was a Finnish boxer. He competed in the men's lightweight event at the 1948 Summer Olympics. At the 1948 Summer Olympics, he lost to Maxie McCullagh of Ireland.

References

1924 births
1993 deaths
Finnish male boxers
Olympic boxers of Finland
Boxers at the 1948 Summer Olympics
People from Sortavala
Lightweight boxers